Antoine Magnan (13 June 1881 – 5 March 1938) was a French zoologist and aeronautical engineer who studied the flight of insects and birds for possible lessons to apply to powered flight. He is best known for a remark in his 1934 book Le Vol des Insectes ("Insect Flight") that insect flight was impossible.

Life and work

Magnan was born in the central 7th arrondissement of Paris on 13 June 1881. He qualified as a doctor of medicine and of science, and received the diploma of superior studies in zoology. He became a professor of animal mechanics applied to aviation at the Collège de France (from 1929 to 1938), and the director of the experimental morphology laboratory and the aviation laboratory at the École pratique des hautes études in Paris. He was responsible to the ministries of Education, Agriculture and the Interior.

Insect flight

The following passage appears in the introduction to Le Vol des Insectes:

This translates to:

Magnan refers to his assistant, the mathematician and engineer André Sainte-Laguë as the source of the calculations mentioned.

Works

 Le tube digestif et le Régime alimentaire des Oiseaux. Hermann, 1911.
 Le Poids des tectrices chez les oiseaux carinatés. Imprimerie Nationale, 1912.
 Les caractéristiques des oiseaux suivant le mode de vol: leur application a la construction des avions. Masson, 1922.
 Le vol des oiseaux: directives que l'on peut en tirer pour l'aviation. G. Roche D'Estrez, 1922.
 Pour voler à voile: études expérimentales sur le vol à voile des oiseaux avec l'application à l'aviation (extraits de L'air). G. Roche D'Estrez, 1923.
 "L'Énergie interne du vent et le vol à voile". Revue generale des sciences pures et appliquees, 28 Feb 1925, v.36, pp. 101–11.
 L'Accélérographe H.M.P.: Son application à la mesure des accélérations en vol. With E. Huguenard and A. Planiol. 1926
 Essai de Théorie Du Poisson. With André Sainte-Laguë. Services Techniques de l'Aéronautique, 1929.
 Les caractéristiques géométriques et physiques des poissons avec contribution à l'étude de leur équilibre statique et dynamique, Volumes 1-2. Masson, 1929.
 Hodographes et polaires d'avions, 1930.
 Étude des trajectoires et des qualités aérodynamiques d'un avion par l'emploi d'un appareil cinématographique de bord. With André Sainte-Laguë. E. Blondel La Rougery, 1932.
 "Sur le poids relatif des muscles moteurs des ailes chez les insectes." With C. Perrilliat-Botonet. C. R. Acad. Sci. v.195, pp. 559–561.
 Cinématographie jusqu'à 12000 vues par seconde avec application à l'étude du vol des insectes. Hermann, 1932.
 Sur l'excédant de puissance des oiseaux. Hermann, 1933.
 Le Vol des Insectes ("Insect Flight"). Volume 1 of Locomotion chez les animaux ("Locomotion in Animals"), Hermann, 1934.

References

1881 births
1938 deaths
French entomologists
French aerospace engineers
20th-century French zoologists